The Big Man (US title: Crossing the Line) is a 1990 feature film. It stars Liam Neeson, Joanne Whalley and Billy Connolly. The film's score was composed by Ennio Morricone. It is based on the 1986 novel of the same name by William McIlvanney.

Plot
A Scottish miner (Liam Neeson) becomes unemployed during a union strike. He is unable to support his family and cannot resolve his bitterness about his situation. Desperate for money, he accepts an offer made by a Glasgow gangster to fight in an illegal bare-knuckle boxing match. A long and brutal fight follows.

Production
Filmed at locations in Coalburn, Glasgow and Spain.

Cast
Liam Neeson as Danny Scoular
Joanne Whalley-Kilmer as Beth Scoular
Billy Connolly as Frankie
Ian Bannen as Matt Mason
Juliet Cadzow as Margaret Mason
Tom Watson as Tommy Brogan
Hugh Grant as Gordon
Kenny Ireland as Tony
George Rossi as Eddie 
Julie Graham as Melanie 
Johnny Beattie as Beth's father
Amanda Walker as Beth's mother
Peter Mullan as Vince
Pat Roach as Billy
Maurice Roeves as Cam Colvin

Reception

Critical reception
The Radio Times wrote "the script turns cartwheels to gain resonance from Mrs Thatcher's duel with the miners, but to little avail: the picture is "pumped-up" yet irredeemably dull." whereas Time Out described the film as "one of Britain's finest existential thrillers in ages...There are minor flaws, but as a portrait of one man's desperate struggle to survive against all odds, the film is tough, taut and intelligently critical of the man's world it depicts."

Box office
The film opened at the Odeon West End and grossed £24,727 in its opening week. It went on to gross £268,000 in the UK.

References

External links
 
 

1990 films
1990 drama films
Scottish films
British boxing films
Mining in Scotland
Films scored by Ennio Morricone
Films directed by David Leland
English-language Scottish films
1990s English-language films
1990s British films